Wladimir Rudolf Karl Freiherr Giesl von Gieslingen (18 February 1860 – 20 April 1936) was an Austro-Hungarian general and diplomat during World War I, most famous for delivering the ultimatum to the Serbian government during the July Crisis of 1914.

Life 
After studies at the Theresian Military Academy in 1879, he was commissioned as a lieutenant. Following graduation from the War College in 1884, he was promoted and attached to the General Staff. He subsequently served in various units in Tarnau (now Tarnów), Brno, Sarajevo and Theresienstadt (now Terezín). 

In 1893, he was appointed as military attaché to the Austro-Hungarian Embassy at Constantinople (now Istanbul) and was promoted to major the following year. Following the Greco-Turkish War of 1897, he took part in the peacekeeping activities on Crete. In 1898, he was additionally appointed as a military attaché in Athens and Sofia and received promotion to colonel in 1900. In 1906, he was promoted to generalmajor and the following year he was a member of the Austro-Hungarian delegation to the Second Hague Peace Conference. In 1909, he was appointed as minister at Cetinje and the following year promoted to feldmarschallleutnant. 

On 13 November 1913, Baron Giesl von Gieslingen was appointed Austro-Hungarian minister at Belgrade and would play a key role the following year during the July Crisis. On 28 June 1914, the Austro-Hungarian heir apparent Archduke Franz Ferdinand was assassinated in Sarajevo. On 23 July, he presented the Austro-Hungarian ultimatum to the Serbian authorities with a 48-hour deadline. The instruction from Foreign Minister Count von Berchtold was to leave the country immediately should the Serbian government not accept all the points of the ultimatum. The reply was delivered by the Serbian Prime Minister Pasic five minutes before the deadline expired on 25 July. As the Serbian government did not accept all the points, Baron Giesl von Gieslingen declared that diplomatic relations were broken off and left on a train half an hour later. On 28 July 1914, Austria-Hungary formally declared war with Serbia and World War I had started. Baron Giesl von Gieslingen's role during the July Crisis has been much debated by historians over the years and some have criticised him for leaving Belgrade too rapidly.

Upon his return to Vienna, Baron Giesl von Gieslingen was appointed to be a liaison officer of the Foreign Ministry at the Army Headquarters and promoted to general of the cavalry in August 1914. However, the Chief of the General Staff General Conrad von Hötzendorf accused him of passing on military secrets to Count von Berchtold and wished to see him replaced. Baron Giesl von Gieslingen thus requested to be transferred to the front, which was rejected and he retired in January 1915 from active service. 

In 1917, he was sent on a diplomatic mission to Constantinople where he carried out the preparations for the visit of Emperor Karl I in early 1918.

His older brother Arthur was also a general who commanded an army corps during the Serbian campaign in early autumn 1914, but who was replaced after suffering setbacks. 

His memoirs, compiled and published by Eduard von Steinitz, throw interesting light on Balkan conditions before the war and add some details concerning the final diplomatic rupture between Austria-Hungary and Serbia in 1914. He was awarded Order of the White Eagle.

Baron Giesl von Gieslingen died at Salzburg on 20 April 1936.

Notes

References

Bibliography 
 Eduard Ritter von Steinitz, Zwei Jahrzehnte im Nahen Orient: Aufzeichnungen des Generals der Kavallerie Baron Wladimir Giesl, Berlin, Verlag für Kulturpolitik, 1927.

External links 
 'Giesl von Gieslingen Wladimir Frh.', Österreichisches Biographisches Lexikon 1815-1950
 'Wladimir Giesl von Gieslingen', Solving Problems Through Force
 'Giesl von Gieslingen, Wladimir Freiherr', AEIOU
 'Wladimir Giesl Freiherr von Gieslingen', Austro-Hungarian Army

1860 births
1936 deaths
19th-century Austrian people
20th-century Austrian people
Austro-Hungarian military personnel of World War I
Austro-Hungarian diplomats of World War I
Austrian diplomats
Austro-Hungarian generals
Grand Crosses of the Order of Franz Joseph
Recipients of the Order of Military Merit (Bulgaria)
Barons of Austria
Austrian expatriates in Poland
Austrian expatriates in Turkey
People from Pécs
Theresian Military Academy alumni